The Green Party of Michigan is a political party in Michigan. It is the state affiliate of the Green Party of the United States (GPUS). The party has had ballot access in Michigan since November 2000, when their presidential candidate, Ralph Nader captured 2.74% of the national vote and 2% in Michigan. In 2016, the Green Party of Michigan elected 5 officers to local governments.

In Michigan the Green Party elected a candidate to office in its first year. That candidate was JoAnne Beemon who became the first Green elected in Michigan, when on election day 2000 she received 5,349 votes (86%) to become Drain Commissioner in Charlevoix County. Beemon was credited with thwarting construction of a Wal-Mart store, by formulating storm water runoff regulations stricter than the county stormwater ordinance. She informed Wal-Mart of this on February 12, 2004. Two months later in a phone call to Beemon on April 6, 2004, Wal-Mart project manager Allen Oertel acknowledged that the company altered its plan based on information from Beemon that it did not previously know of. Wal-Mart later ended the project.  The Michigan party is a member of the Michigan Third Parties Coalition.

Elected Officials
In 2016, the Green Party of Michigan saw five candidates get elected to office:
 Korie Blyveis  - Newberg Twp Clerk (Cass Co)
 Tom Mair - Grand Traverse Co Board/District 2
 Jesse Torres - Holly Twp Park Commissioner
 Stuart Collis - Ypsilanti Twp Park Commissioner
 Shauna McNally - Ypsilanti Twp Park Commissioner

2018 Slate of Candidates
sources:

 Jennifer V Kurland – Governor
 Charin Davenport – Lieutenant Governor
 Marcia Squier – US Senate
 John V. McDermott – US House/9th District
 Harley Mikkelson – US House/10th District
 D. Etta Wilcoxon – US House/13th District
 Rev. David Bullock – State Senate/1st District
 Jessicia Smith – State Senate/14th District
 Eric James Borregard – State Senate/22nd District
 Robert Alway – State Senate/26th District
 Wade Roberts – State Senate/38th District
 John Anthony La Pietra – State House/63rd District
 Robin Lea Laurain – State House/68th District
 Jacob Straley – State House/75th District
 Sherry A Wells – State Board of Education
 Kevin A. Graves – U-M Board of Regents
 Aaron Mariasy – MSU Board of Trustees
 Gina Luster – Genesee County Board/District 2
 Tom Mair – Grand Traverse County Board/District 2
 Charlotte Aikens – Kent County Board/District 12
 Mitchell Bonga – Warren Woods School Board (non-partisan)

2014 and 2016 Slate of Candidates
updated thru 2014-10-09; one of the sources is

Nominated at 2014 State Convention:

Paul Homeniuk – Governor
Candace Caveny – Lieutenant Governor
John Anthony La Pietra – Attorney General 
Chris Wahmhoff – US Senator
Ellis Boal – US Representative/1st District
Tonya Duncan – US Representative/3rd District
John M. Lawrence – US Representative/6th District
Jim Casha – US Representative/8th District
John V. McDermott – US Representative/9th District
Harley Mikkelson – US Representative/10th District
Stephen Boyle – US Representative/14th District
Sherry A. Wells – State Board of Education
Ian Swanson – U of M Board of Regents
Terry Link – MSU Board of Trustees
Adam Adrianson – MSU Board of Trustees
Margaret Guttshall – Wayne St U Bd of Governors
Latham T. Redding – Wayne St U Bd of Governors
Tom Mair – Grand Traverse County Board/2nd District
Wayne Vermilya – Presque Isle County Board/1st District

Endorsed at State Convention (running for non-partisan office):

Eric Borregard – Washtenaw Community College Board
Joe Connolly – Northwest Michigan College Board

Nominated at County Caucuses:

Sarah Molenaar – Kalamazoo County Board/1st District
Fred Vitale – Wayne County Board/1st District

Nominated at 2016 State Convention:
 Ellis Boal - US House/1st District
 Matthew A. Brady - US House/2nd District
 Jordan Salvi - US House/4th District
 Harley Mikkelson -  US House/5th District
 Maria Green - US House/8th District
 John V. McDermott - US House/9th District
 Benjamin Nofs - US House/10th District
 Dylan Calewarts - US House/12th District
 Marcia Squier -  US House/14th District
 Dan Finn - State House/4th District
 Tiffany Hayden - State House/11th District
 Artelia Marie Leak - State House/29th District
 Eric Borregard - State House/52nd District
 Joseph Stevens - State House/53rd District
 John Anthony La Pietra - State House/63rd District
 Michael Anderson - State House/70th District
 Deena Marie Bruderick - State House/83rd District
 Cliff Yankovich - State House/86th District
 Wade Roberts - State House/109th District
 Sherry A. Wells - State Board of Education
 Derek Grigsby - State Board of Education
 Latham Redding - U of M Board of Regents
 Will Tyler White - MSU Board of Trustees
 Margaret Guttshall - WSU Board of Governors
 Fran Shor - WSU Board of Governors
Candidates endorsed for local races:
 Korie Blyveis  - Newberg Twp Clerk (Cass Co) (won)
 Celeste Bondie - Emmet County Board/District 4
 Veda Balla - Genesee County Commission, District 4
 Tom Mair - Grand Traverse Co Board/District 2 (won)
 Jesse Torres - Holly Twp Park Commissioner (Oakland County) (won)
 Wayne Vermilya - Presque Isle Co Board/District 1
 Stuart Collis - Ypsilanti Twp Park Commissioner (Washtenaw County) (won)
 Shauna McNally - Ypsilanti Twp Park Commissioner (Washtenaw County) (won)
 Eric Siegel - Oakland Community College Board of Trustees

See also 
 Libertarian Party of Michigan
 Natural Law Party
 Politics of Michigan
 Government of Michigan
 Elections in Michigan
 Political party strength in Michigan
 Law of Michigan
 List of politics by U.S. state

References

External links
Green Party of Michigan (Official site)

Michigan
Political parties in Michigan
State and local socialist parties in the United States